is a Japanese football manager and former player who is the current manager of J3 League club Iwate Grulla Morioka.

Playing career
Born in Hamamatsu, Shizuoka Prefecture, Matsubara spent time playing with Peñarol of Uruguay upon graduating from Tokai University Shoyo Senior High School. He joined J1 League team Júbilo Iwata in 1994 upon his return to Japan, then making a series of moves starting with Shimizu S-Pulse, JEF United Ichihara, Rijeka of Croatia, Delémont of Switzerland, Shonan Bellmare, Progreso of Uruguay, Avispa Fukuoka, Defensor Sporting of Uruguay, Okinawa Kariyushi FC and Shizuoka FC.

Matsubara also represented the Japan U23 national team, and was part of the 1996 Summer Olympics team which defeated the Brazil which included players such as Rivaldo, Roberto Carlos and Bebeto.

Career statistics

Managerial statistics

References

External links
 
 
 
  FELICE MONDO INC. Official website

1974 births
Living people
Association football people from Shizuoka Prefecture
Japanese footballers
Peñarol players
C.A. Progreso players
Defensor Sporting players
J1 League players
J2 League players
Júbilo Iwata players
Shimizu S-Pulse players
JEF United Chiba players
HNK Rijeka players
Croatian Football League players
Shonan Bellmare players
Avispa Fukuoka players
Japanese expatriate footballers
Expatriate footballers in Switzerland
Expatriate footballers in Croatia
Japanese expatriate sportspeople in Croatia
Expatriate footballers in Uruguay
Swiss Super League players
Footballers at the 1996 Summer Olympics
Olympic footballers of Japan
Football clinics
Japanese football managers
J3 League managers
SC Sagamihara managers
Iwate Grulla Morioka managers
Association football forwards